Victor Smith (1913–1998) was a senior officer within the Royal Australian Navy.

Victor Smith may also refer to:

Victor Smith (English footballer) (1878–1951), footballer with Southampton
Alfred Victor Smith (1891–1915), English recipient of the Victoria Cross
Victor Lewis-Smith, British satirist
Vic Coppersmith-Heaven (born Victor Smith), English  sound engineer and record producer
Vic Smith, New Zealand international football (soccer) player
Vic Smith (Australian footballer) (1893–1972), Australian rules footballer